The premier of New South Wales is the head of government in the state of New South Wales, Australia. The Government of New South Wales follows the Westminster Parliamentary System, with a Parliament of New South Wales acting as the legislature. The premier is appointed by the governor of New South Wales, and by modern convention holds office by his or her ability to command the support of a majority of members of the lower house of Parliament, the Legislative Assembly.

Before Federation in 1901 the term "prime minister of New South Wales" was also used. "Premier" has been used more or less exclusively from 1901, to avoid confusion with the federal prime minister of Australia.

The current premier is Dominic Perrottet, the leader of the New South Wales Liberal Party, who assumed office on 5 October 2021. Perrottet replaced Gladys Berejiklian on 5 October 2021, after Berejiklian resigned as premier.

List of premiers of New South Wales

See also 

 List of premiers of New South Wales by time in office
 Deputy Premier of New South Wales
List of New South Wales government agencies

References

New South Wales premiers

Ministers of the New South Wales state government